The Goan sausage or chorise is a typical reflection of Indo-Portuguese cuisine from Goa, which once were part of the Portuguese State of India. It is based on the chorizo sausage, introduced from Portugal. The humidity of Goa made it difficult to produce European-styled sausages that would keep, and so the meat was pickled in vinegar, alcohol and a chilli-spice mix before being placed in pig-gut. The Goan sausage is therefore of Iberian origin and related to the Spanish Chorizo, both of which go through a process called "pimenton".

Preparation 

The Goan sausage is prepared starting with large chunks of boneless pork that are sliced or chopped and heavily salted. The chopped meat is allowed to dry in the sun for one to two days. Following this, a mixture of spices, ground hot chili peppers, palm vinegar, and feni, a local liquor, is added. After filling into casings, the resulting sausages are again dried in the sun or smoked slowly.

It is usually served in a curry, boiled or fried, accompanied by white rice or baked potatoes and sometimes also with a boiled egg. Slices may be simply boiled with onion and vinegar.

According to tradition, they are prepared in the dry season around December-March and consumed in greater quantities during the monsoon season, when fish is scarce. The sausages are high in protein.

Consumption 
Goan sausage is a versatile food, being sold everywhere from street food carts to high end restaurants, being used in sandwiches, stews, fillings in breads, soups, or eaten alone as a side with rice.

Choris pão or sausage buns are the most common forms of snacks. Choris pão has the sausages chopped (sometimes with onions and a dash of curry) and placed inside a poi or the local Goan bun, a chewier form of the western Indian pav, and is a popular fast food sold by vendors during religious fairs or in cafés. It is a signature snack bought and eaten during the feast of St. Francis Xavier at Old Goa. Sausage buns are more modern, having the choris baked into a bun and are available at most cafés and restaurants.

In the form of a fusion food, minced sausages are also stuffed and fried between the layers of parathas and naans. They are frequently seen on restaurant menus in Goa despite neither flat bread being endemic to the region.

The sausages are also crumbled or cut and added to curries, stews, chilly fry (a sautée of vegetables and meat, usually beef), and pulão or pulav for flavour and animal protein in Goan households.

See also
Doh snam
Gyurma
Kargyong

References

Goan cuisine
Indian fusion cuisine
Pork dishes
Portuguese fusion cuisine
Sausages
Indian sausages